Debbie Deere (born July 14, 1964) is an American politician. She has served as a Democratic member for the 40th district in the Kansas House of Representatives since 2017.

References

1964 births
Living people
Democratic Party members of the Kansas House of Representatives
21st-century American politicians
Women state legislators in Kansas
21st-century American women politicians